Manuel Pavía y Lacy, 1st Marquess of Novaliches (6 July 1814 – 22 October 1896), was a Spanish marshal.

Biography 
He was born at Granada on 6 July 1814, the son of Colonel Pavía, and after a few years at the Jesuit school in Valencia he entered the Royal Artillery Academy at Segovia. In 1833 he became a lieutenant in the guards of Queen Isabella II, and during the Carlist War from 1833 to 1840 he became general of division in the latter year at the early age of twenty-six. The Moderate party made him war minister in 1847 and sent him to Catalonia, where his efforts to put down a Carlist rising were not attended with success. He had been made a senator in 1845, and marquis in 1848.

He was sent out to Manila in 1852 as governor-general of the Philippine Islands. In April 1854 he crushed with much sternness a formidable insurrection and carried out many useful reforms. On his return to Spain he married the Countess of Santa Isabel, and commanded the reserves in the Peninsula during the war with Morocco. He refused the war portfolio twice offered him by Marshals O'Donnell and Narvaez and in 1864 was briefly president of government (prime minister) at the head of a cabinet of conservative-liberal Moderates; his government lasted but a few days.

He volunteered to crush the insurrection in Madrid on 22 June 1866, and when the revolution broke out in September 1868 accepted the command of Queen Isabella's troops. He was defeated by Marshal Serrano at the bridge of Alcolea on 28 September 1868, and was so badly wounded in the face that he was disfigured for life.

After the coup of December 1874 restored the liberal monarchy, Pavía went to meet Alfonso XII of Spain when the king landed at Valencia in January 1875. The Restoration made the Marquis de Novaliches a senator, and the new king gave him the Golden Fleece. He died in Madrid on 22 October 1896.

References

1814 births
1896 deaths
People from Granada
Marquesses of Novaliches
Spanish generals
Knights of the Golden Fleece
Military personnel of the First Carlist War
Captains General of the Philippines
Spanish nobility